The 1986-87 Four Hills Tournament took place at the four traditional venues of Oberstdorf, Garmisch-Partenkirchen, Innsbruck and Bischofshofen, located in Germany and Austria, between 30 December 1986 and 6 January 1987.

Results

Overall

References

External links 
 Official website 

Four Hills Tournament
1986 in ski jumping
1987 in ski jumping
1986 in German sport
1987 in German sport
1987 in Austrian sport